The small-angle approximations can be used to approximate the values of the main trigonometric functions, provided that the angle in question is small and is measured in radians:

These approximations have a wide range of uses in branches of physics and engineering, including mechanics, electromagnetism, optics, cartography, astronomy, and computer science. One reason for this is that they can greatly simplify differential equations that do not need to be answered with absolute precision.

There are a number of ways to demonstrate the validity of the small-angle approximations. The most direct method is to truncate the Maclaurin series for each of the trigonometric functions.

Justifications

Graphic 
The accuracy of the approximations can be seen below in Figure 1 and Figure 2. As the measure of the angle approaches zero, the difference between the approximation and the original function also approaches 0.

Geometric 

The red section on the right, is the difference between the lengths of the hypotenuse, and the adjacent side, .

The opposite leg, is approximately equal to the length of the blue arc, .

Simplifying leaves,

Calculus 
Using the squeeze theorem, we can prove that
 which is a formal restatement of the approximation  for small values of θ.

A more careful application of the squeeze theorem proves that  from which we conclude that  for small values of θ.

Alternatively, we can use the double angle formula . By letting , we get that .

Algebraic 

The Maclaurin expansion (the Taylor expansion about 0) of the relevant trigonometric function is 

where  is the angle in radians. In clearer terms, 

One can thus safely approximate: 

By extension, since the cosine of a small angle is very nearly 1, and the tangent is given by the sine divided by the cosine,

Error of the approximations

Figure 3 shows the relative errors of the small angle approximations. The angles at which the relative error exceeds 1% are as follows:

  at about 0.1408 radians (8.07°)
  at about 0.1730 radians (9.91°)
  at about 0.2441 radians (13.99°)
  at about 0.6620 radians (37.93°)

Angle sum and difference 
The angle addition and subtraction theorems reduce to the following when one of the angles is small (β ≈ 0):
{|
|style="text-align:right;"| cos(α + β) ||≈ cos(α) − β sin(α),
|-
|style="text-align:right;"| cos(α − β) ||≈ cos(α) + β sin(α),
|-
|style="text-align:right;"| sin(α + β) ||≈ sin(α) + β cos(α),
|-
|style="text-align:right;"| sin(α − β) ||≈ sin(α) − β cos(α).
|}

Specific uses

Astronomy 
In astronomy, the angular size or angle subtended by the image of a distant object is often only a few arcseconds, so it is well suited to the small angle approximation. The linear size is related to the angular size and the distance from the observer by the simple formula:

where  is measured in arcseconds.

The exact formula is

Motion of a pendulum 
The second-order cosine approximation is especially useful in calculating the potential energy of a pendulum, which can then be applied with a Lagrangian to find the indirect (energy) equation of motion.

When calculating the period of a simple pendulum, the small-angle approximation for sine is used to allow the resulting differential equation to be solved easily by comparison with the differential equation describing simple harmonic motion.

Optics
In optics, the small-angle approximations form the basis of the paraxial approximation.

Wave Interference 
The sine and tangent small-angle approximations are used in relation to the double-slit experiment or a diffraction grating to simplify equations, e.g. 'fringe spacing' = 'wavelength' × 'distance from slits to screen' ÷ 'slit separation'.

Structural mechanics 
The small-angle approximation also appears in structural mechanics, especially in stability and bifurcation analyses (mainly of axially-loaded columns ready to undergo buckling). This leads to significant simplifications, though at a cost in accuracy and insight into the true behavior.

Piloting 
The 1 in 60 rule used in air navigation has its basis in the small-angle approximation, plus the fact that one radian is approximately 60 degrees.

Interpolation 
The formulas for addition and subtraction involving a small angle may be used for interpolating between trigonometric table values:

Example: sin(0.755)

where the values for sin(0.75) and cos(0.75) are obtained from trigonometric table

See also 
 Skinny triangle
 Infinitesimal oscillations of a pendulum
 Versine and haversine
 Exsecant and excosecant

References 

Trigonometry
Equations of astronomy